Alina Joyce Bicar (born November 17, 1997) is a Filipino professional volleyball player currently playing for the Chery Tiggo 7 Pro Crossovers in the Premier Volleyball League. Bicar played setter for and was a former captain of the UST Golden Tigresses.

Volleyball career

UAAP 
Bicar was a member of UST Golden Tigresses collegiate women's University team.

In 2020, Bicar became the captain of the team in the UAAP Season 82 volleyball tournaments but later on, the tournament was cancelled because of the COVID-19 pandemic.

PVL 
Alina Bicar was a member and Captain of BaliPure Purest Water Defenders in 2021. He left BaliPure in the on going  2021 PVL Open Conference and signed for the Petro Gazz Angels. 

In 2022, she signed again with BaliPure Purest Water Defenders and back as the captain of the team for the 2022 PVL Open Conference. 

In  May 2022, she transferred to Chery Tiggo Crossovers but she and her Team mates EJ Laure, Justine Dorog, and Buding Duremdes missed the 3 games of 2022 PVL Invitational Conference due to the health and safety protocols.

Clubs 
  Power Smashers - (2017)
  Chooks-to-Go Tacloban Fighting Warays - (2018)
  Smart-Army Giga Hitters - (2018)  
  PacificTown-Army Lady Troopers - (2019)
  BaliPure Purest Water Defenders - (2021),(2022)
 Petro Gazz Angels - (2021)
   Chery Tiggo Crossovers - (2022 - present)

Awards

Collegiate

Clubs

Notes 
 a. Alina Bicar left BaliPure in the on going Pvl 2021 Open Conference and joined Petro Gazz Angels.
 b. Alina Bicar rejoined BaliPure for the 2022 PVL Open Conference.
 c. Alina Bicar was signed by the Chery Tiggo Crossovers.

References 

Filipino women's volleyball players
Living people
1997 births
21st-century Filipino women
Setters (volleyball)